Cruddasia is a genus of flowering plants in the legume family, Fabaceae. It belongs to the subfamily Faboideae.

Species 
 Cruddasia craibii
 Cruddasia insignis
 Cruddasia laotica
 Cruddasia multifoliolata
 Cruddasia pinnata

References

External links 

Phaseoleae
Fabaceae genera